Lujo Tončić-Sorinj (12 April 1915 – 20 May 2005) was an Austrian diplomat and politician of the conservative Austrian People's Party (ÖVP). He served as Foreign Minister from 1966 to 1968 and as Secretary General of the Council of Europe from 1969 to 1974.

Life
Born in the Austro-Hungarian capital Vienna, he was a member of a Croatian family ennobled in 1911. His paternal grandfather Josip Tončić-Sorinj (1847–1931) had been governor in the Kingdom of Dalmatia, his father served as consul in Jeddah. Tončić-Sorinj attended the Gymnasium in Salzburg and, having obtained his Matura degree, went on to study law, philosophy and Slavistics at the Vienna University and the University of Zagreb. During World War II, he taught languages in a signal corps of the Luftwaffe.

In 1945, Tončić-Sorinj became chairman of the political department of the Austrian Institute for the Economy and Politics in Salzburg, and he joined the newly created ÖVP. Later he was member of the Austrian UNESCO commission and of the Austrian delegation to the advisory convention of the Council of Europe. From 1949 to 1966, he was member of the Austrian National Council parliament for the ÖVP, from 1966 to 1968 he was foreign minister in the cabinet of Chancellor Josef Klaus. Relying on the 1946 Gruber–De Gasperi Agreement, Minister Tončić-Sorinj played a vital role in the negotiations with Italy over the autonomy of South Tyrol. A new Austro-Italian agreement was finally achieved under his successor Kurt Waldheim. Also, Tončić-Sorinj initiated the implementation of the United Nations Office at Vienna (UNOV), with the Vienna International Centre built from 1973 onwards as one of four major UN office sites. From 1969 to 1974, he was Secretary General of the Council of Europe.

After the Revolutions of 1989 and the Breakup of Yugoslavia, Tončić-Sorinj strongly supported the independence of Croatia. In 1992 he decided to take the Croatian citizenship because of his family connections to Dalmatia, but as a result he lost Austrian citizenship.  With help from his political party, he became an Austrian citizen again.

|-
| width="30%" align="center" | Preceded by:Bruno Kreisky
| width="40%" align="center" | Foreign Minister of Austria1966–1968
| width="30%" align="center" | Succeeded by:Kurt Waldheim
|-
| width="30%" align="center" | Preceded by:Peter Smithers
| width="40%" align="center" | Secretary General of the Council of Europe1969–1974
| width="30%" align="center" | Succeeded by:Georg Kahn-Ackermann
|-

1915 births
2005 deaths
Austrian diplomats
Austrian untitled nobility
Council of Europe Secretaries-General
Croatian nobility
Foreign ministers of Austria
Politicians from Vienna
Austrian people of Croatian descent
People from the Kingdom of Dalmatia